Çayırlı District is a district of Erzincan Province in Turkey. The municipality of Çayırlı is the seat and the district had a population of 8,383 in 2021.

The district was established in 1954.

Composition 
Beside the seat of Çayırlı, the district encompasses forty-eight villages and thirty-one hamlets.

Religion 
In 1989, anthropologist Andrews counted 64 villages in the district of which Alevis were present in 54 villages and Sunni Muslims in 13 villages.

References 

Districts of Erzincan Province